Trenton Junction railway station is an unstaffed  inter-city train station at 18277B Telephone Road in Trenton, Ontario, Canada operated by Via Rail.

Station Services
The unstaffed station shelter is heated and has telephones and washrooms. It is opened 60 minutes prior to train arrivals at the station and remains open for 30 minutes following train departures.

References

External links

Via Rail stations in Ontario
Railway stations in Hastings County, Ontario
Canadian National Railway stations in Ontario